Sir Henry William Martin, 2nd Baronet (20 December 1768 – 3 February 1842) was an English amateur cricketer.

Martin was born on 20 December 1768 at Bishopstown, County Cork, Ireland. He was the eldest surviving son of the naval officer, Henry Martin, naval officer, and was the elder brother of naval officer Thomas Byam Martin.

Cricket career
Martin was an English amateur cricketer who made 7 known appearances in first-class cricket matches from 1797 to 1813 as well as numerous appearances in other significant matches.  His name is given as "Marten" in most if not all cricket sources. Martin was mainly associated with Surrey and was a member of Marylebone Cricket Club (MCC). Sir Henry died on 3 February 1842 at his house in Upper Harley Street, London.

British West Indies
Of a family long resident in Antigua and Montserrat his 271-page Travel journal of Sir H. W. Martin is in the manuscripts collection of the British Library and many pages are displayed online by the British Library, external link below.

Auctioneer's description: Fine and extensive journal of Sir Henry Martin of Harley Street, London, chronicling his visit to the West Indies between 1836 and 1837, a detailed manuscript journal, closely written on 271 pages, with one pencil sketch showing a group of carts crossing a bridge, bound in marbled boards, 8vo A highly important account by a high status visitor to the West Indies at a very early date. Martin appears to be a very meticulous individual, with an eye for minute detail throughout his journey in every degree, making this an invaluable record not only of the West Indies, but also the general conditions in every place he visited, including the U.K. For example, he leaves Piccadilly in December 1836 via the Herald Coach to Falmouth noting, "Passage money inside £4:5:0, outside £2:5:0 - I had three enquiries made at the coach office on different days to ascertain the exact time that the coach got into Falmouth for the purpose of ordering dinner or not ...". He then notes in great detail the time taken to reach Falmouth. He leaves Piccadilly at 9.47am, reaching Bagshot at 53 minutes past noon, for example. He and his family (with servant) leave Falmouth on board the Mutine, the passage for all costing £38. On board are a group of Cornish miners going to Cuba on a mining scheme. During the journey, he logs latitudes and longitudes for the entire passage, and details the day to day happenings on the vessel. The family reach the West Indies the following February and the journal is equally detailed about the topography and general social conditions which Martin observes. For example, he says of Martinique, "There are here many excellent shops, which would not disgrace Paris, and many private houses three storeys high and from four to six windows in line, chiefly I think built of stone ... we went to a hotel (as it's called) kept by a mulatto woman called Parker, a native of Barbados and well known to all naval persons who have been here of late years - I think she must be nearly 60 but she looks very much younger. She is quite a character and a very shrewd one too ...". This is an invaluable insight into the early 19th century, which deserves considerable research. 

Martin owned three sugar plantations in Antigua, and when the British government emancipated the slaves in the 1830s, he was associated with many others including slave owners, mortgagees and bankers in mostly unsuccessful claims for compensation for the liberation of over 300 slaves to the tune of about £10,000.

References

External sources
 CricketArchive profile

External links
 Images of some of Martin's travel journal online

 
 

1768 births
1842 deaths
English cricketers
English cricketers of 1787 to 1825
Surrey cricketers
Baronets in the Baronetage of Great Britain
Surrey and Marylebone Cricket Club cricketers
Non-international England cricketers
Marylebone Cricket Club cricketers
Cricketers from County Cork